Messalina, Messalina!, also known as Caligula II: Messalina, Messalina and Caligula:sins of Rome, is a 1977 Italian sex comedy and sword-and-sandal spoof.

Background
The film is not in fact a sequel nor a prequel to Tinto Brass' 1979 film Caligula. During the time that Caligula spent in post-production, the film's co-producer Franco Rossellini wanted to get usage from the $20,000,000 of sets and costumes used in Caligula, fearing that the film would never be released.
The sets and costumes, as noted in the film's opening credits, were those from Caligula, designed by Danilo Donati and used without his consent. Anneka Di Lorenzo, who plays the title role of Messalina, had played the same role in Caligula. Lori Wagner, who played Agrippina in Tinto Brass' film, also reprises her role.

Synopsis
The film begins with Messalina (Anneka Di Lorenzo), the wife of Claudius (Vittorio Caprioli), who is now Emperor succeeding Caligula.
Most of the film revolves around Messalina's adulterous behavior, while Claudius remains blissfully unaware. Empress Messalina is having sex with every man in Rome except her husband Claudius, a traveler who has come to Rome looking for a good time, and a Roman con-man. It all ends in a comedic and gory bloodbath when Claudius comes home early and finds an orgy taking place in the palace. Claudius and his soldiers kill Messalina and all of the orgy participants.

Cast
Anneka Di Lorenzo ... Messalina
Vittorio Caprioli ... Claudius
Giancarlo Prete ... Gaius Silius
Lino Toffolo ... Giulio Nelio, the Man from Venice 
Tomas Milian... Baba
Lori Wagner ... Agrippina (as Lory Kay Wagner) 
Raf Luca ...
Bombolo ... Zenturio Bisone 
Pino Ferrara ...
Salvatore Borghese ... Mevius (as Sal Borgese) 
Alessandra Cardini ... Calpurnia
Luca Sportelli ...
Ombretta De Carlo ...
Marco Tulli ... Senofonte (as Primo Marco Tulli)

Release
The film was released in Italy on August 25, 1977.

Notes

External links

1970s sex comedy films
1970s adventure comedy films
1977 films
Italian adventure comedy films
Films set in ancient Rome
Films set in the Roman Empire
Films set in the 1st century
Films shot in Italy
Commedia sexy all'italiana
1970s Italian-language films
Films directed by Bruno Corbucci
Films scored by Guido & Maurizio De Angelis
Italian parody films
1970s parody films
Cultural depictions of Messalina
Cultural depictions of Claudius
Cultural depictions of Agrippina the Younger
1977 comedy films
Films with screenplays by Mario Amendola
1970s Italian films